West Newton is one of the thirteen villages within the city of Newton in Middlesex County, Massachusetts, United States.

Among the oldest of the thirteen Newton villages, the West Newton Village Center is a National Register Historic District. The postal ("Zip") code 02465 roughly matches the village limits.

Location
West Newton is located in the north central part of Newton and is bordered by the town of Waltham on the north and by the villages of Auburndale on the west, Newton Lower Falls on the extreme southwest, Newtonville on the east, and Waban on the south.

Railroad Station
The West Newton train stop is located near an inn (now small shops) that served as a stagecoach stop.  The original station structure was destroyed in the construction of the Massachusetts Turnpike, although the station itself still exists as a stop on the commuter rail.

West Newton Square 
West Newton Square, the town center of West Newton, is home to many local businesses and venues.  These include the historic West Newton Cinema, a small theatre that shows independent films, which was originally called the West Newton Theatre.

Many popular restaurants are located in West Newton, ranging from the more upscale Bluebird Cafe to Sweet Tomatoes Pizza, and Paddy’s public house. Blue Ribbon Bar-B-Q is another local favorite, and attracts fans from far and wide.

There are several civic buildings in West Newton Square. They include the Newton Police Department and the local courthouse, both located on Washington Street, as well as the Chinese Community Center on Elm Street. The square once had a branch of the Newton Free Library as well as the Davis Elementary School on Waltham Street. Both closed in the 1980s owing to municipal financial constraints. The library building on Chestnut Street is now a police annex, while the school operates as a community center.

Losses due to turnpike construction

 West Newton Fire House, Washington Street
 West Newton Boston and Albany Railroad Station
 Lincoln Park, Washington Street, although the Lincoln Park Baptist Church, where Martin Luther King Jr. once preached, still exists.
 The Curve Street neighborhood, originally settled by freed slaves before the Civil War and still inhabited by many black families and the largely black Myrtle Baptist Church, was considerably reduced in size.
 Tony's drug store. Tony moved the business to a corner location out of the way of the turnpike, but to the detriment of the old-fashioned atmosphere.  The new place was called the Newtondale Pharmacy.
 The Block: at Washington St. and Davis Court.  1st floor was store fronts; the upper floors were apartments.  When you went around to the back you could see all the back porches which overlooked a lot with railroad cars and Border Street.
 Davis Ct: still exists as completely commercial, however, the houses scattered on the land are all gone; 5 Davis Court was a duplex.

Transportation 
West Newton is served by the MBTA Commuter Rail (Framingham/Worcester Line) and is roughly one mile from the Woodland station on the Green Line D branch.  West Newton is also served by express buses 505, 553, 554 that provide service to Boston and Waltham.

West Newton also has easy access to the Massachusetts Turnpike and Route 128 (Massachusetts)/I-95.  The Massachusetts Turnpike (Interstate 90) runs through West Newton.  Routes 30 and 16 also pass through the West Newton.

Places on the National Register of Historic Places

 Arthur F. Luke House: 221 Prince St. (added March 16, 1990)
 Brae-Burn Historic District: Brae Burn and Windmere Rds. (added March 16, 1990)
 C. A. Sawyer House (Second): 86 Waban Ave. (added March 16, 1990)
 C. G. Howes Dry Cleaning-Carley Real Estate: 1173 Washington St. (added March 16, 1990)
 Charles D. Elliott House: 7 Colman St. (added October 4, 1986)
 Charles W. Noyes House: 271 Chestnut St. (added March 16, 1990)
 Charles Maynard House: 459 Crafts St. (added May 4, 1996)
 Day Estate Historic District: Commonwealth Ave. and Dartmouth St. (added March 16, 1990)
 Dr. Samuel Warren House: 432 Cherry St. (added February 3, 1985)
 First Unitarian Society in Newton: 1326 Washington St. (added October 4, 1986)
 Galen Merriam House: 102 Highland St. (added October 4, 1986)
 George W. Eddy House: 85 Bigelow Rd. (added March 16, 1990)
 House at 170 Otis Street: 170 Otis St. (added October 4, 1986)
 Levi Warren Jr. High School: 1600 Washington St. (added March 16, 1990)
 Nathaniel Topliff Allen Homestead: 25 Webster St. (added February 9, 1978)
 Peirce School: 88 Chestnut St. (added 1979)
 Railroad Hotel: 1273-1279 Washington St. (added October 4, 1986)
 Second Church in Newton: 60 Highland St. (added March 16, 1990)
 Webster Park Historic District: Along Webster Pk. and Webster St. between Westwood St. and Oak Ave. (added October 4, 1986)
 West Newton Hill Historic District: Roughly bounded by Highland Ave., Lenox, Hampshire, and Chestnut Sts. (added October 4, 1986)
 West Newton Village Center Historic District: Roughly Washington St. from Putnam to Davis Ct. (added March 16, 1990)
 West Parish Burying Ground: River and Cherry Sts. (added December 13, 2004)
 Windsor Road Historic District: Windsor and Kent Rds. (added March 16, 1990)
Fourteen of these are pictured below.

Notable people 

Mitch Albom, author
Isaac Asimov, science fiction author of I, Robot
Sheldon Brown, bicycle mechanic and technical authority
Richard B. Carter native and lifelong resident of West Newton,  head of Carter's Ink Company from 1905 to 1949, lived at 11 Forest Ave. WN
Matt Damon, actor, first made famous from Good Will Hunting
Bette Davis
Joe DeNucci
Ralph Waldo Emerson
Mickey Fisher (1904/05–1963), basketball coach
Nathaniel Hawthorne, Sophia Peabody Hawthorne, Julian Hawthorne, and Rose Hawthorne
Steven Hyman, neuroscientist and Provost of Harvard University
Julian Jaynes, psychologist, professor, writer
John Krasinski 
Timothy Leary, Harvard professor and LSD researcher
Matt LeBlanc, actor most widely known as Joey in Friends
Jack Lemmon
Mark Mahoney, tattoo artist, owner of Shamrock Social Club in Los Angeles, whose celebrity clients include Johnny Depp, Angelina Jolie
David Mamet, playwright, screenwriter and film director
Mark Mancuso, meteorologist The Weather Channel (United States)
Horace Mann 
Olga C. Nardone, Wizard Of Oz Munchkin "1939" (Villager, SleepyHead, Middle Lullaby League) 6/8/1921—9/24/2010 10 Bellevue Street
Don Nottebart, MLB player
Cyrus Peirce, for whom Peirce School is named
Osgood Perkins, actor, father of Anthony Perkins
Rebecca Pidgeon, film actress who is married to David Mamet
Seth Putnam, leader from noisecore band Anal Cunt
Morrie Schwartz, subject of the best-selling book Tuesdays With Morrie
Harriet Beecher Stowe, author of Uncle Tom's Cabin
Edward Wagenknecht, American literary critic, prolific writer and BU professor lived on Otis Street, WN
Frank E. Winsor, for whom Winsor Dam is named, lived at 189 Mt. Vernon St. WN
Howard Zinn

External links 

History of Newton Villages 
Historic postcard of Brae Burn Country Club WN
Historic postcard of West Newton Railway Station which was destroyed when the Turnpike came through

Villages in Newton, Massachusetts
Villages in Massachusetts